Jack Dean Kingsbury (born 1934) is the former Aubrey Lee Brooks professor of theology at Union Presbyterian Seminary in Richmond, Virginia, now an emeritus professor.

He is a scholar of the New Testament, specializing in the Book of Matthew and the other Synoptic Gospels. As a biblical scholar, he wrote a number of books on New Testament topics.

Works

Books

as Editor

Articles and Chapters

Festschrift

References

American biblical scholars
New Testament scholars
Living people
People from Richmond, Virginia
Union Presbyterian Seminary faculty
1934 births
Concordia Seminary alumni